Črešnova is a small settlement in the hills north of Zreče in northeastern Slovenia. The area is part of the traditional region of Styria. It is now included with the rest of the Municipality of Zreče in the Savinja Statistical Region.

References

External links
Črešnova at Geopedia

Populated places in the Municipality of Zreče